Men's 200m races for wheelchair athletes at the 2004 Summer Paralympics were held in the Athens Olympic Stadium. Events were held in four disability classes.

T51

The T51 event consisted of a single race. It was won by Edgar Navarro, representing .

Final Round
25 Sept. 2004, 19:05

T52

The T52 event consisted of 2 heats and a final. It was won by Andre Beaudoin, representing .

1st Round

Heat 1
26 Sept. 2004, 22:25

Heat 2
26 Sept. 2004, 22:31

Final Round
27 Sept. 2004, 19:55

T53

The T53 event consisted of 3 heats and a final. It was won by Hong Suk Man, representing .

1st Round

Heat 1
25 Sept. 2004, 11:30

Heat 2
25 Sept. 2004, 11:36

Heat 3
25 Sept. 2004, 11:42

Final Round
27 Sept. 2004, 19:40

T54

The T54 event consisted of 3 heats and a final. It was won by Leo Pekka Tahti, representing .

1st Round

Heat 1
20 Sept. 2004, 12:00

Heat 2
20 Sept. 2004, 12:06

Heat 3
20 Sept. 2004, 12:12

Final Round
21 Sept. 2004, 20:15

References

M